Westringia longepedunculata is a species of plant in the mint family that is endemic to Australia. It is found in south-eastern Queensland, and is sometimes considered to be a synonym of Westringia cheelii.

References

longepedunculata
Lamiales of Australia
Flora of Queensland
Plants described in 1949